The 1985 Yonex All England Open Championships was the 75th edition held in 1985, at Wembley Arena, London.

Final results

Men's singles

Seeds

Section 1

Section 2

Women's singles

Seeds

Section 1

Section 2

Men's doubles

Women's doubles

Mixed doubles

References

All England Open Badminton Championships
All England Open
All England
All England Open Badminton Championships in London
All England Open Badminton Championships
All England Open Badminton Championships